LPL may refer to:

Organizations 
 Lambeth Palace Library, of the Church of England
 LG Display, a South Korean LCD panel maker, NYSE symbol
 London Public Library, Ontario, Canada
 LPL Financial, US broker and dealer
 Luxembourgish Patriot League, WWII resistance movement
 Lycée Prince de Liège, a Belgian school in Kinshasa, DRC

Science 
 Lipoprotein lipase, an enzyme that hydrolyzes lipids
 Lunar and Planetary Laboratory, Tucson, Arizona, USA
 Lipoate–protein ligase, an enzyme

Sports 
 Lanka Premier League, a Twenty20 cricket league
 League of Legends Pro League, top level of professional League of Legends in China

Other uses
 Lucent Public License, an open-source license
 London Property Letter, UK
 Liverpool John Lennon Airport, UK (by IATA airport code)
 Lease-a-Plane International, Northbrook, Illinois, USA (by ICAO airline code)